Maytenus  is a genus of flowering plants in the family Celastraceae. Members of the genus are distributed throughout Central and South America, Southeast Asia, Micronesia and Australasia, the Indian Ocean and Africa. They grow in a very wide variety of climates, from tropical to subpolar. The traditional circumscription of Maytenus is paraphyletic, so many species have been transferred to Denhamia, Gymnosporia, Monteverdia, and Tricerma.

Selected species
 Maytenus abbottii A.E.van Wyk
 Maytenus acuminata (L.f.) Loes.
 Maytenus boaria Molina (type species)
 Maytenus buxifolia (A.Rich.) Griseb. (West Indies)
 Maytenus canariensis (Loes.) G. Kunkel & Sunding
 Maytenus curtissii (King) Ding Hou
 Maytenus hookeri Loes.
 Maytenus jamesonii Briq.
 Maytenus lucidus
 Maytenus magellanica (Lam.) Hook.f.
 Maytenus obtusifolia
 Maytenus octogona
 Maytenus oleoides Loes.
 Maytenus oleosa A.E.van Wyk & R.H.Archer
 Maytenus phyllanthoides Benth. – Florida mayten, guttapercha mayten
 Maytenus procumbens (L.f.) Loes.
 Maytenus reynosioides Urb.
 Maytenus undata (Thunb.) Blakelock
 Maytenus vitis-idaea – Indian's salt
 Maytenus williamsii A.Molina

Undescribed species:
 Maytenus sp. nov. A Miller (Yemen)

Formerly placed here
 Denhamia bilocularis (F.Muell.) M.P. Simmons – Orangebark
 Denhamia cunninghamii (Hook.) M.P. Simmons – Koonkara
 Denhamia disperma (F.Muell.) M.P. Simmons
 Denhamia fasciculiflora (Jessup) M.P. Simmons
 Denhamia ferdinandi (Jessup) M.P. Simmons
 Denhamia silvestris (Lander & L.A.S.Johnson) M.P. Simmons – Narrow-leaved orangebark, orange bark, orange bush
 Gymnosporia addat Loes.
 Gymnosporia austroyunnanensis (S.J. Pei & Y.H. Li) M.P. Simmons
 Gymnosporia dhofarensis (Sebsebe) Jordaan
 Gymnosporia diversifolia Maxim. (as M.  diversifolia (Maxim.) Ding Hou)
 Gymnosporia harenensis (Sebsebe) Jordaan
 Gymnosporia heterophylla (Eckl. & Zeyh.) Loes. (as M. heterophylla (Eckl. & Zeyh.) N. Robson)
 Gymnosporia nemorosa (Eckl. & Zeyh.) Szyszyl. (as M. nemorosa (Eckl. & Zeyh.) Marais)
 Gymnosporia rothiana (Walp.) Wight & Arn. ex M.A.Lawson (as M. rothiana (Walp.) Lobr.-Callen)
 Gymnosporia royleana Wall. ex M.A.Lawson (as M. royleana (Wall. ex M. A. Lawson) Cufod.)
 Gymnosporia senegalensis (Lam.) Loes. (as M.  senegalensis (Lam.) Exell)
 Gymnosporia thomsonii Kurz (as M. thomsonii (Kurz) V.S.Raju & Babu)
 Monteverdia aquifolia (Mart.) Biral
 Monteverdia clarendonensis (Britton) Biral
 Monteverdia crassipes (Urb.) Biral
 Monteverdia cymosa (Krug & Urban) Biral – Caribbean mayten
 Monteverdia eggersii (Loes.) Biral
 Monteverdia elongata (Urban) Biral – Puerto Rico mayten
 Monteverdia harrisii (Krug & Urb.) Biral
 Monteverdia ilicifolia (Mart. ex Reissek) Biral
 Monteverdia jefeana (Lundell) Biral
 Monteverdia krukovii (A.C. Sm.) Biral
 Monteverdia laevigata (Vahl) Biral – White cinnamon
 Monteverdia laevis (Reissek) Biral
 Monteverdia macrocarpa (Ruiz & Pav.) Biral
 Monteverdia manabiensis (Loes.) Biral
 Monteverdia matudae (Lundell) Biral
 Monteverdia microcarpa (Fawc. & Rendle) Biral
 Monteverdia ponceana (Britt.) Biral
 Monteverdia quadrangulata (Schrad.) Biral
 Monteverdia robusta (Reissek) Biral
 Monteverdia stipitata (Lundell) Biral

Cultivation and uses
Maytenus boaria and Maytenus magellanica are the most known species in Europe and the United States because these are the most cold-tolerant trees of this mostly tropical genus. The bark of Maytenus krukovii has a variety of documented medicinal properties; it is also sometimes admixed into decoctions of ayahuasca.

References

 Flora of Pakistan

 
Celastrales genera
Ayahuasca
Taxonomy articles created by Polbot